Halpert is a Norman French surname which varied from the French surname Halbert, and ultimately derives from the Germanic masculine name Adelbert. It may refer to:

People
Edith Halpert (1900–1970), Russian-born American art dealer and collector
Herbert Halpert (1911–2000), American anthropologist and folklorist
Jeremy de Halpert (born 1947), British naval officer and politician
Samuel Halpert (1884–1930), Russian-born American painter
Shmuel Halpert (born 1939), Romanian-born Israeli rabbi and politician
Violetta Maloney Halpert (1919–2009), American folklorist, researcher, and US naval officer

Fictional characters
Characters from the U.S. television sitcom The Office:
Betsy Halpert
CeCe Halpert
Gerald Halpert
Jim Halpert
Pam Halpert  (née Beesly)
Peter Halpert
Philip Halpert
Thomas Halpert

Jewish surnames
Yiddish-language surnames